A general election was held in the U.S. state of Wyoming on Tuesday, November 2, 2010. All of the state's executive officers—the Governor, Secretary of State, Auditor, Treasurer, and Superintendent of Public Instruction—were up for election.

Gubernatorial election

Incumbent Governor Dave Freudenthal, a Democrat, was ostensibly unable to run for re-election due to term limits. Despite the questionable legality of the state's term limits, Freudenthal did not challenge his inability to seek re-election and declined to seek a third term. Former U.S. Attorney Matt Mead narrowly won the Republican nomination while former Teton County Commissioner Leslie Petersen won the Democratic primary. In the general election, Mead defeated Petersen in a landslide.

Secretary of State
Incumbent Secretary of State Max Maxfield, a Republican, ran for re-election to a second term.

Democratic primary

Candidates
 Andrew Simons, political activist

Results

Republican primary

Candidates
 Max Maxfield, incumbent Secretary of State

Results

General election

Results

Maxfield

Auditor
Incumbent Republican Auditor Rita Meyer opted to run for Governor rather than seek re-election to a second term. In the Republican primary, two accountants—Jim Brown, the former Vice-Chairman of the Republican Party of Wyoming, who unsuccessfully ran against Meyer in 2006, and Cynthia Cloud—ran to succeed her. During the campaign, Brown attracted widespread support from the Republican establishment and outraised Cloud, but she narrowly defeated him in the primary, which the Casper Star-Tribune called "the biggest upset of the election."

No Democrat filed for the race, but former State Senator and then-Casper City Councilman Keith Goodenough won 31 write-in votes, despite not being a candidate. Under Wyoming law, Goodenough could have accepted the nomination, but ultimately declined to do so, opting to run for re-election to the Casper City Council instead.

Democratic primary

Candidates
No Democratic candidates filed.

Results

Republican primary

Candidates
 Cynthia Cloud, accountant
 Bruce Brown, accountant, former Vice-Chairman of the Republican Party of Wyoming, 2006 candidate for State Auditor

Results

General election

Results

Treasurer
Incumbent Republican Treasurer Joe Meyer, first elected in 2006, opted to run for re-election. He was unopposed in the Republican primary, and no Democratic candidates filed to run in the primary. Worth Christie, an insurance agent in Casper, despite not being a candidate, received 30 write-in votes in the Democratic primary. However, Christie ultimately declined to accept the nomination, instead opting to run for the Casper College Board of Trustees. With no candidates filed to run against him, Meyer was re-elected unopposed. However, just two years into his term, Meyer would die in office and was replaced by Mark Gordon.

Democratic primary

Candidates
No candidates filed.

Results

Republican primary

Candidates
 Joe Meyer, incumbent Treasurer

Results

General election

Results

Superintendent of Public Instruction
Incumbent Republican Superintendent of Public Instruction Jim McBride ran for re-election to a second term. However, owing to controversy surrounding the state's standardized testing system,  he faced strong competition in the Republican primary from Cindy Hill, a high school assistant principal; Trent Blankenship, the former Superintendent of Public Instruction; and Ted Adams, the Laramie County School District 1 Superintendent. Hill established herself as the leading candidate against McBride, with polling showing her with a double-digit lead on the incumbent while Blankenship was forced to defend his 2005 decision to abruptly resign from office. Ultimately, Hill won the primary by a wide margin, winning 49% of the vote to McBridge's 25%, Blankenship's 15%, and Adams's 11%.

Meanwhile, State Senator Mike Massie, long considered a candidate for statewide office, won the Democratic primary unopposed and emerged as the party's strongest candidate in the statewide races. He campaigned on ditching the state's beleaguered standardized testing regime and attacked Hill for releasing her education plan only weeks before the election. Popular Democratic Governor Dave Freudenthal endorsed Massie as the general election started, and criticized the state's Republican leadership for its inaction in fixing education problems. He also won the endorsement of the Casper Star-Tribune, which praised his "clear handle on what needs to happen at the Department of Education" and argued that he was "the right person at the right time for this very demanding job." The Star-Tribune criticized Hill for the delay in releasing her platform, which it called "more of a philosophical statement than a blueprint to improve education." The Jackson Hole News and Guide also endorsed Massie, praising him as "well-versed in the education issues Wyoming faces" and as a policymaker who "listens and offers pragmatic solutions to the problems facing Wyoming educators today." As the campaign closed out, Massie's fundraising remained strong, allowing him to stay competitive with Hill.

Despite Massie's strength as a candidate, however, he was unable to overcome the state's significant Republican lean, and lost to Hill in a landslide, winning only 39% of the vote to her 61%. However, in so doing, he received the most votes of any statewide Democratic candidate, significantly outpacing Leslie Petersen, the party's gubernatorial nominee.

Democratic primary

Candidates
 Mike Massie, State Senator

Results

Republican primary

Candidates
 Cindy Hill, assistant high school principal
 Jim McBride, incumbent Superintendent of Public Instruction
 Trent Blankenship, former Superintendent of Public Instruction 
 Ted Adams, Laramie County School District 1 Superintendent

Results

General election

Results

References